The Bouwerie Lane Theatre is a former bank building which became an Off-Broadway theatre, located at 330 Bowery at Bond Street in Manhattan, New York City. It is located in the NoHo Historic District.

The cast-iron building, which was constructed from 1873-1874, was designed by Henry Engelbert in the Italianate style for the Atlantic Savings Bank, which became the Bond Street Saving Bank before the building was completed. When the bank failed in 1879, the building was sold to the German Exchange Bank, which served the German immigrant community. Prior to the 1960s, the building was used for the storage of fabrics. Then in 1963, the building was converted into a theater by Honey Waldman, who produced several plays there. From 1974 to 2006, it was the home of the Jean Cocteau Repertory Theatre.

Among the many plays and musicals that were produced at the theatre, the first was The Immoralist (1963) with Frank Langella, Dames at Sea (1968), Night and Day (2000) by Tom Stoppard, Brecht's The Threepenny Opera (2003), and the Cocteau's final production, Jean Genet's The Maids X 2 (2006).

The building was purchased by Adam Gordon in 2007 for conversion into a private mansion with a climbing wall, and the Bowery street front used for retail.

In 1967, the building was designated a New York City landmark, and it was added to the National Register of Historic Places in 1980. The AIA Guide to New York City calls it "One of the most sophisticated cast-iron buildings."

See also
National Register of Historic Places listings in New York County, New York
List of New York City Designated Landmarks in Manhattan

References
Notes

External links

"Bouwerie Lane Theatre" at the Internet Off-Broadway Database

Cast-iron architecture in New York City
Theatres on the National Register of Historic Places in Manhattan
Off-Broadway theaters
New York City Designated Landmarks in Manhattan
Henry Engelbert buildings
Italianate architecture in New York City
Commercial buildings completed in 1874
Bank buildings in Manhattan
Bowery
1963 establishments in New York City